Robert Horan (August 9, 1922 - September 19, 1981) was an American poet.

Life
He lived with Pauline Kael in Berkeley, California.
He was part of the "Activist" group. 
He was friends with Gian Carlo Menotti, and Samuel Barber, staying with them at "The Capricorn", at Mount Kisco, New York.

His work appeared in Harper's, Poetry, and Kenyon Review.

Awards
 1948 Yale Series of Younger Poets Competition

Works
 A Beginning (New Haven, Conn.,  1948  )

Criticism
"In Defense of Dylan Thomas", Kenyon Review, 1945

References

External links

1922 births
1981 deaths
Yale Younger Poets winners
20th-century American poets